

Erich Bärenfänger (12 January 1915 – 2 May 1945) was a German general during World War II. He was a recipient of the Knight's Cross of the Iron Cross with Oak Leaves and Swords of Nazi Germany. In the final days of the war, Bärenfänger was commander of several defense sectors during the Battle of Berlin; he committed suicide on 2 May 1945.

Berlin, 1945
Towards the end of World War II, Bärenfänger took part in the Battle for Berlin. On 24 April, due to the direct command of Hitler, Bärenfänger was given command of defence sectors A and one day later also command of sector B. Bärenfänger mounted at least two unsuccessful armored attacks northwards up the Schönhauser Allee. The second was on 1 May.

Members of SS-Brigadeführer Wilhelm Mohnke's "break out group" saw quite a sight thanks to Bärenfänger.  On 1 May, the group left the surrounded central government sector, which included the Führerbunker. As they made their escape, there before them they saw a "host" of new Tiger II tanks and "artillery pieces" arrayed around the Flak tower as if "on parade". Bärenfänger was allegedly seated in the turret cupola of one of the Tigers thus arrayed. On 2 May, Bärenfänger, a devoted Nazi, committed suicide with his young wife and her brother in a side street of Berlin.

Awards
 Iron Cross (1939) 2nd Class (12 June 1940) & 1st Class (21 June 1940)
 Infantry Assault Badge in Silver (23 July 1941)
 Knight's Cross of the Order of the Crown of Romania with Swords 5th Class (13 August 1941)
 Honour Roll Clasp of the Army (14 August 1942)
 German Cross in Gold on 26 December 1941 as Leutnant of the Reserves in the 7./Infanterie-Regiment 123
 Knight's Cross of the Iron Cross with Oak Leaves and Swords
 Knight's Cross on 27 August 1942 as Oberleutnant and leader of the III./Infanterie-Regiment 123
 243rd Oak Leaves on 17 May 1943 as Hauptmann and commander of the III./Grenadier-Regiment 123
 45th Swords on 23 January 1944 as Major and commander of the III./Grenadier-Regiment 123
 Bulgarian Order of Bravery (7 February 1942)
 Medal of the Royal Bulgarian infantry in Silver (7 February 1942)

References

Citations

Bibliography

 
 
 
 
 

1915 births
1945 suicides
People from Menden (Sauerland)
Major generals of the German Army (Wehrmacht)
People from the Province of Westphalia
Recipients of the Gold German Cross
Recipients of the Knight's Cross of the Iron Cross with Oak Leaves and Swords
Knights of the Order of the Crown (Romania)
Recipients of the Order of Bravery
Battle of Berlin
Nazis who committed suicide in Germany
Joint suicides by Nazis
German military personnel who committed suicide
Military personnel from North Rhine-Westphalia